St. Margaret's School is a private school in Seria, Brunei Darussalam.

History
The school was founded by Mr Amir a resident priest at St. Margaret's Church, in 1955. The first school was an old wooden building which was a vehicle repair shop opposite St. Margaret's Church. The school  started with three classes and had 60 children. It was inaugurated by R.E. Hales, the Managing Director of British Malayan Petroleum Company on 8 April 1956. The school moved to its present site, which was given by the government, in 1959.

The school was established by the efforts of founder Principal Rev L R Melling and the parishioners of St Margaret’s Church in Seria at Lorong Tiga to cater for those who wanted English as the medium of instruction. It was officially opened by R E Hales, managing director of British Malayan Petroleum Company on 8 April 1956.

In January 1960, the school opened a secondary section with Form 1.

In February 1960, John Heath took over as the principal.

The ARCON building was inaugurated by the  Managing Director of Brunei Shell Petroleum, PM Linton, on 7 May 1961.

The first batch of candidates from St Margaret's entered the Brunei Certificate of Education in November 1962 (which was later changed to PMB) and the Cambridge School Certificate of Examination in 1964.

A new classroom block was inaugurated by the Bishop of Borneo on 26 February 1967, and the principal's quarters were completed in October 1967.

Mr Curie (Australia) took over for a short while as acting principal. John Heath served the school as principal until 1970.

A new school block was opened in December 2012.

School song
We are proud that our school is St.Margaret's, Seria
The place of our studies to fit us for life.
Each morning we study with teachers to guide us.
At home we are busy to learn all they've taught.
We are boys and we are girls with lives stretched out before us.
Oh! what shall we do with this life that is ours?
We'll fit ourselves daily to be meh people;
To serve God and neighbour the rest of our lives.

School prayer
Almighty God, bless our schools.
Help all teachers and scholars.
Give us grace to do what is right
and strength to do what is difficult.
May we always honour Your name. Amen.

Principals

See also

 Education in Asia  
 List of schools in Brunei

References

External links
 , the school's official website

Private schools in Brunei
Margaret's School, Brunei
Secondary schools in Brunei
Educational institutions established in 1955
1955 establishments in the British Empire